Elections were held in Saba on 20 March and 23 May 2019. These include:

 2019 Dutch island council elections
 2019 Dutch electoral college elections
 2019 European Parliament election in the Netherlands

Elections in Saba (island)